Lesquin is a commune in the Nord department in northern France.

Population

Heraldry

Economy
When Flandre Air existed, it had its head office at Lille Airport and in Lesquin. On 30 March 2001 Flandre, Proteus Airlines, and Regional Airlines merged into Régional, itself merged into HOP! in 2013.

Sport
Lesquin is the home of Championnat de France Amateurs club, US Lesquin.

Airport
Lille Airport is located in Lesquin.

See also

Communes of the Nord department

References

Communes of Nord (French department)
French Flanders